Schadt is a surname. Notable people with the surname include:

 André Schadt, German swimmer
 Daniela Schadt (born 1960), German journalist and domestic partner of Joachim Gauck, President of Germany
 Eric Schadt (born 1965), American mathematician and computational biologist
 Martin Schadt (born 1938), Swiss physicist and inventor

See also
 Schad